Leptodeira ashmeadii, the banded cat-eyed snake, is a species of snake in the family Colubridae.  The species is native to Colombia, Venezuela, Trinidad and Tobago, and Brazil.

References

Leptodeira
Snakes of South America
Reptiles of Colombia
Reptiles of Venezuela
Reptiles of Trinidad and Tobago
Reptiles of Brazil
Reptiles described in 1845
Taxa named by Edward Hallowell (herpetologist)